The Marquesan Nature Reserves are a network of small nature reserves in the Marquesas Islands.  The reserves were declared by the government of French Polynesia in 1992, as a first step toward preserving the native flora and fauna of some of the smaller islands of the group.

The reserve system presently consists of four units:
Eiao Island Nature Reserve, encompassing Eiao and its surrounding rocks
Hatutu Nature Reserve, including the island of Hatutu and its surrounding rocks
Motane Nature Reserve, including the islands of Moho Tani and Terihi, as well as a few surrounding rocks
Motu One Reserve, covering the coral reef and sandy island network of Motu One

In 1996 Lucien Kimitete, the Mayor of Nuku Hiva, proposed that the Marquesas become a UNESCO World Heritage Site. In May 2022 public consultations on their listing began.

See also

Flora of the Marquesas Islands
List of animals of the Marquesas Islands

References

Environment of the Marquesas Islands
Nature reserves